Oven and Shaker is a restaurant serving Neapolitan pizza, located in Portland, Oregon's Pearl District, in the United States. The base of the pizza is Neapolitan and the company specializes in exotic toppings such as pork belly, roasted corn, mascarpone, poblano peppers, juicy blackberries, peaches, goat cheese, and arugula.

Plans for a second location in Beaverton were announced in October 2019.

See also
 Cathy Whims
 List of Italian restaurants
 Pizza in Portland, Oregon

References

External links
 
 

Italian-American culture in Portland, Oregon
Italian restaurants in Oregon
Pearl District, Portland, Oregon
Pizzerias in Oregon
Restaurants in Portland, Oregon